Sirsi may refer to:

 Sirsi, Karnataka, India
 Sirsi, Raebareli, Uttar Pradesh, India
 Sirsi, Uttar Pradesh, India
 Sirsi Assembly constituency, a constituencie of the Karnataka Legislative Assembly
 Sirsi Corporation or SirsiDynix, a United States company that produces software and associated services for libraries

See also
 Sirsia